Mosquito Creek, about 60 mi. (97 km) long, is a tributary of the Missouri River in southwest Iowa in the United States. It rises near Earling, in Shelby County, and flows in a generally southwesterly direction, meeting the  Missouri approximately 5 mi. (8 km) downstream of Council Bluffs.

Mosquito Creek was named by pioneer settlers (Mormons) for the great number of mosquitoes near this stream when they camped there.

See also
List of Iowa rivers

References

Rivers of Harrison County, Iowa
Rivers of Pottawattamie County, Iowa
Rivers of Shelby County, Iowa
Rivers of Iowa
Tributaries of the Missouri River